Zoltán Balog may refer to:

Zoltán Balog (astronomer) (born 1972), Hungarian astronomer
Zoltán Balog (footballer) (born 1978), Hungarian footballer
Zoltán Balog (politician) (born 1958), Hungarian Calvinist pastor and politician